The Alaska Department of Environmental Conservation (ADEC) is the state of Alaska's environmental regulatory agency. The Alaska Legislature established ADEC in 1971, and the agency's responsibilities were transferred from the Alaska Department of Health. As of 2022 the ADEC Commissioner is Jason W. Brune.

The department administers laws and regulations pertaining to the areas of water quality, water rights and water resources, shoreline management, toxics clean-up, nuclear waste, hazardous waste, and air quality. It also conducts monitoring and scientific assessments.

References

External links 
 Alaska Department of Environmental Conservation - Official site

Environment
State environmental protection agencies of the United States
Alaska